Strukovci (Prekmurje Slovene: Strükovci) is a settlement in the  Municipality of Puconci in the Prekmurje region of Slovenia. It is divided into the hamlets of Zgornji Strukovci ('Upper Strukovci') and Spodnji Strukovci ('Lower Strukovci').

Notable people
Notable people that were born or lived in Strukovci include:
István Küzmics (ca. 1723–1779), Lutheran writer. The house he was born in is protected as a monument and there is a commemorative plaque on the building.

References

External links
 Strukovci on Geopedia
 Home page Strukovci 

Populated places in the Municipality of Puconci